Bressay transmitting station is a broadcasting transmission facility for the Shetland Islands, located on the isle of Bressay, owned and operated by Arqiva (previously National Grid Wireless). The transmitting station is based on the Ward of Bressay, the island's highest peak.

The facility includes two steel lattice towers both over 70m high.
It first came into service on 1 April 1964 transmitting BBC Television on Band I VHF channel 3 and the Scottish Home Service, Light Programme and Third on Band II VHF, using the same frequencies as today. (Home Service now Radio Shetland, Light R2 and Third R3).

Services listed by frequency

Analogue radio

† Licensed to transmit at 50 kW.

Digital television

Before switchover

Analogue television

Digital switchover
The digital switchover happened in two stages.

In Stage One, BBC Two Scotland was switched off and anyone with Freeview, BT Vision or Top Up TV needed to re-tune. The date for this was 5 May 2010.

In Stage Two, analogue was permanently switched off and anyone with Freeview, BT Vision or Top Up TV needed to re-tune again. The date for this stage was 19 May 2010.

HD and high-powered Freeview services replaced the analogue signals.

See also
 List of masts
 List of tallest buildings and structures in Great Britain
 List of radio stations in the United Kingdom

References

External links
 The Transmission Gallery: Bressay Transmitter photographs and information
 The Transmission Gallery: Television coverage map
 The Transmission Gallery: Radio coverage map
 www.mds975.co.uk: Images and info on Bressay transmitter

Buildings and structures in Shetland
Transmitter sites in Scotland
Bressay